Ikard is a surname. Notable people with the surname include:

Bose Ikard (ca. 1840s–1929), African-American cowboy
Frank N. Ikard (1913–1991), American politician
Gabe Ikard (born 1990), American football player
William S. Ikard (1847–1934), American cattle rancher

See also
List of Beast Wars II: Super Life-Form Transformers characters#Maximals